Franco Rotella (16 November 1966 – 20 April 2009) was an Italian professional footballer who played as a midfielder. He made over 300 league appearances in Italian football for Genoa, SPAL, Triestina, Pisa, Atalanta, and Imperia.

External links
 Obituary

1966 births
2009 deaths
Italian footballers
Deaths from cancer in Liguria
Deaths from melanoma
Association football midfielders
U.S. Imperia 1923 players